Dedaj  is a surname. Notable people with the surname include: 

Anton Dedaj (born 1980), Croatian footballer
Arjola Dedaj (born 1981), Italian Paralympic athlete
Dugagjin Dedaj (born 1989), Swiss footballer

Albanian-language surnames